DXKO (1368 AM) Radyo Ronda is a radio station owned and operated by the Radio Philippines Network. The station's studio is located along C.M. Recto Ave., Brgy. Gusa, Cagayan de Oro, and its transmitter is located at Sitio Balon, Brgy. Tablon, Cagayan de Oro.

References

Radio Philippines Network
RPN News and Public Affairs
Radio stations in Cagayan de Oro
Radio stations established in 1969